The mountain ground squirrel (Geosciurus princeps) is a rodent that is native to southwestern Angola, western Namibia, and western South Africa.  It is also known as the Kaoko ground squirrel or the Damara ground squirrel.

It is the closest relative of the Cape ground squirrel (Latin name Geosciurus inauris), which is so similar in appearance that the two are difficult to distinguish in the field. Both species have long bushy black and white tails with a white stripe from the shoulder towards the rump. Geosciurus princeps is slightly larger, on average, than G. inauris, although there is considerable overlap in body size. Differences in skull morphology also distinguish the two species, and the incisors are yellow to orange rather than white as in G. inauris.

Distribution
The mountain ground squirrel is restricted to a narrow band of the southwest arid region of Africa from southern Angola to southern Namibia and as far south as Richtersveld National Park.

Description
The mountain ground squirrel is a large-bodied squirrel with small ears. The body is covered in short, pale cinnamon brown hair, which changes to white on the belly, around the eyes, and on the front of the face. A white stripe extends from shoulders to hips. There is no underfur, and the skin is black. Tail hairs are white with three black stripes.

Behavior
Mountain ground squirrels are strictly diurnal. Adult females may live alone or in small family groups, while males are mostly solitary. In contrast to the Cape Ground Squirrel, they are not known to exhibit play behaviors, allogrooming, or other social behaviors. They build burrows in areas with sparse cover.

References

External links
 Kruger Park page on the Mountain Ground Squirrel
 Uniprot taxonomy page on Geosciurus princeps
Thorington, R. W. Jr. and R. S. Hoffman. 2005. Family Sciuridae. pp. 754–818 in Mammal Species of the World, a Taxonomic and Geographic Reference. D. E. Wilson and D. M. Reeder eds. Johns Hopkins University Press, Baltimore. 

Geosciurus
Mammals of Angola
Mammals of Namibia
Mammals of South Africa
Mammals described in 1929
Taxa named by Oldfield Thomas
Taxobox binomials not recognized by IUCN